Baghu Nallah is a village located in the Indian union territory of Jammu and Kashmir. The village has a Gurudwara (Sikh Shrine) in the memory of great saints of Jammu and Kashmir, Sant Mela Singh and Sant Rocha Singh. Every year a large number of devotees come here to celebrate in the memory of those great saints.

References

Villages in Ramban district